Kalle Taimi (born 27 January 1992) is a Finnish international footballer who plays for TPS as a right-back or centre-back.

Career
Born in Turku, Taimi has played for SJK, Kerho 07, JIPPO, PS Kemi and Lahti.

He made his international debut for Finland in 2018.

International goals
Scores and results list Finland's goal tally first..

References

External links

 

1992 births
Living people
Finnish footballers
Finland international footballers
Seinäjoen Jalkapallokerho players
SJK Akatemia players
JIPPO players
Kemi City F.C. players
FC Lahti players
Kuopion Palloseura players
IFK Mariehamn players
Turun Palloseura footballers
Kakkonen players
Ykkönen players
Veikkausliiga players
Association football defenders
Footballers from Turku